El Sexto Sentido ('The Sixth Sense') is the tenth studio album by Mexican singer Thalía. It was released on 19 July 2005 by EMI Latin. Its music spans several modern genres, such as Latin pop, dance-pop and R&B. The album, which also has a DVD version, reveals a lot about the personality and life of its performer. It brings more mature, demanding, rhythmic and catchy music. The most successful singles of the album were "Amar sin ser amada", "Un alma sentenciada" and "Seducción". Thalía collaborated again with the Colombian songwriter and producer Estéfano. El Sexto Sentido is an album sung in Spanish, except for three songs translated into English at the end of it. The album overall was well planned, well done and played with emotion.

Four singles were released from the album: "Amar sin ser amada", "Un alma sentenciada", "Seducción" and "Olvídame", all of them became moderate hits on the charts.

The album was reissued in 2006 as El Sexto Sentido Re+Loaded in Mexico. It includes three new songs that did not appear on the original album. Two of the three new songs were released as singles: "Cantando por un sueño" and "No, no, no", the latter is a duet with American bachata singer Anthony "Romeo" Santos. The reissue was nominated for Best Female Pop Vocal Album at the 7th Annual Latin Grammy Awards.

Production and release
Thalía was the executive producer of album and most songs are in Spanish but includes some versions of her songs in English. El Sexto Sentido was the most expensive album during its release in Latin American and Thalía set a record for the largest number of interviews granted to an electronic medium, Televisa. The album was produced by Colombian producer, Estefano. The album was recorded in different countries like Brazil, where the percussions were played and Argentina where various songs were recorded with an orchestra of strings and arrangement with the bandoneon. The bases of the songs were made in Miami. In New York they recorded the vocals and the mixings were done in Puerto Rico. The first single "Amar sin ser amado" was recorded in Buenos Aires and it has several remixes.

El Sexto Sentido is a primarily Latin pop and dance-pop album with slight influences of R&B. It contains some ballads (like "Un alma sentenciada" or "Olvídame"), pop songs (like "Un sueño para dos"), a pop rock/tango song ("Amar sin ser amada"), and Latin dance songs (like "Seducción" and "No me voy a quebrar"). She also covered "Amor Prohibido", which belongs to the fellow Latina Selena, Thalía performed the song Live on Selena ¡VIVE! concert in 2005 and "24,000 Besos", a 1960s Italian hit by Adriano Celentano. On the other hand, El Sexto Sentido Re+Loaded (a reissue of this album) included the bachata-ballad styled song "No, no, no" featuring American singer Anthony "Romeo" Santos.  Lyrically, it talks about the loss of a loved one as in "Olvídame", optimism as in "No Me Voy a Quebrar", fun as in "Seducción" and even to an extremely sensual point in "Sabe Bien".

According to Diana Rodriguez which was the marketing director for Spanish-speaking artists from EMI Latin America the album was the company's most expensive and parallel release at the time, it was treated as an EMI priority and was released simultaneously in United States, Latin America and Japan.

Four singles were released from the album. The lead single, "Amar sin ser amada", is a song that instantly impressed the female audience, thus peaking at the first positions on the charts of Latin America and some European countries. The next three singles, "Un alma sentenciada", "Seducción" and "Olvídame" became moderate hits on the charts.

Commercial performance
El Sexto Sentido debuted at number 3 on the U.S. Billboard Top Latin Albums and at number 63 on the U.S. Billboard 200 with sales of 25,000 copies. The album was held off from being number one on the Billboard Top Latin Albums chart by Shakira's Fijación Oral Vol. 1, which sold 60,000 copies that week. The album also debuted at number 2 on the U.S. Billboard Latin Pop Albums chart. On July 28, 2005, only two weeks after the album's release, El Sexto Sentido was certified gold in Mexico by AMPROFON for sales/shipments of 50,000 copies within the country. The album was certified Gold in Argentina. Even though the song "24,000 Besos" was not released as a single it peak at #83 in Romania. This album was a financial success internationally according to Leila Cobo from Billboard and became the first Spanish-language release in the United States to have a preorder campaign through iTunes. The album sales reached 1 million copies worldwide.

Critical reception

Johnny Loftus from AllMusic gave the album a mixed review and wrote that it's "a straightforward Latin pop album, with the requisite balladry (the rousing "Olvídame" really shows off her voice), bouncy hybrid pop (the bandoneon-flavored opener, "Amar Sin Ser Amada"), and exuberant anthems you can imagine the entire dancefloor singing along with ("Seducción," "No Me Voy a Quebrar") but noted that "while it will likely appeal to her die-hard fans, Thalía's El Sexto Sentido is neither up to her superstar standard nor a domestic breakthrough."

The album has also been nominated in both 2005 and 2006 Latin Billboard Awards and Latin Grammy.

Re-release
On 14 February 2006, the album was reissued as El Sexto Sentido Re+Loaded in Mexico (29 May in Spain, 6 June in the US). It includes three new songs that did not appear on the original album. Two of the three new songs were released as singles: "Cantando por un sueño" and "No, no, no", the latter is a duet with American bachata singer Anthony "Romeo" Santos. The reissue was nominated for Best Female Pop Vocal Album at the 7th Annual Latin Grammy Awards.

Track listing

Charts

Weekly charts

Year-end charts

Certifications and sales

References

External links 

 Promo albums

2005 albums
Thalía albums
EMI Latin albums
Spanish-language albums
Albums produced by Estéfano
Albums produced by Cory Rooney